Love Talk is the tenth studio album by American vocal group, The Manhattans, released in 1979 through Columbia Records.

Reception
The album peaked at No. 20 on the R&B albums chart. It also reached No. 141 on the Billboard 200. The album features the singles "Here Comes the Hurt Again", which peaked at No. 29 on the Hot Soul Singles chart, and "The Way We Were" / "Memories", which reached No. 33 on the same chart.

Track listing

Charts
Album

Singles

References

External links
 

1979 albums
The Manhattans albums
Albums recorded at Sigma Sound Studios
Columbia Records albums